Big Scenic Nowhere is an American desert rock supergroup from California.

History

Demo album (2009–2012)
Big Scenic Nowhere dates back to 2009 when demo recordings of the one-off project were recorded and released under the moniker; some being instrumental versions of songs that were eventually recorded and released by Gary Arce of Yawning Man's additional side project WaterWays, and others being early variations of songs that appeared on the Yawning Man album, Nomadic Pursuits. Through 2012, this short-lived act performed live at concerts with lineups including Arce, Mario Lalli, Tony Tornay and Billy Cordell. John Garcia would guest vocals, notably on the Kyuss-covered Yawning Man song, "Catamaran".

Studio releases (2019–present)
Big Scenic Nowhere was revived as an official band in 2019 by Arce along with Bob Balch of Fu Manchu. The duo released their debut EP, Dying on the Mountain, in 2019 with guest appearances from Nick Oliveri of Mondo Generator, Lalli and Bill Stinson of Yawning Man, Tony Reed of Mos Generator, Per Wiberg of Spiritual Beggars, Lisa Alley and Ian Graham of The Well, and Thomas V. Jäger of Monolord.

Following the band's full-length debut album, Vision Beyond Horizon in January 2020, Reed and Stinson joined as full-time members. The album featured several collaborating artists including Alain Johannes. The group then released their second EP, Lavender Blues on October 23, 2020, notably produced by Chris Goss of Masters of Reality. Guest musicians included Wiberg and Daniel Mongrain of Voivod.

In early 2022, the band released their sophomore album, The Long Morrow, on Heavy Psych Sounds Records. The album consists of recorded material taken from Lavender Blues as well as unused material written around the time of the EP's release. It featured guest appearances from Wiberg, who has since appeared on every release, and Reeves Gabrels of The Cure.

Band members

Current lineup
 Gary Arce – guitar (2009–2012, 2019–present)
 Bob Balch – guitar (2019–present)
 Tony Reed – bass, vocals, synth, guitar (2020–present)
 Bill Stinson – drums (2020–present)

Former touring members
 Mario Lalli – bass (select dates between 2009–2012)
 Tony Tornay – drums (select dates between 2009–2012)
 Billy Cordell – bass (select dates between 2010–2012)
 Greg Saenz – drums (select dates between 2010–2012)

Past collaborators
 Mario Lalli (2019)
 Nick Oliveri (2019–2020)
 Per Wiberg (2019–2022)
 Tony Reed (2019–2020)
 Bill Stinson (2019–2020)
 Lisa Alley (2019–2020)
 Ian Graham (2019–2020)
 Thomas V. Jäger (2019–2020)
 Jim Monroe (2019–2020)
 Alain Johannes (2020)
 Chris Goss (2020)
 Daniel Mongrain (2020)
 Reeves Gabrels (2021)

Discography

Studio albums

EPs

References

External links

Musical groups established in 2009
American stoner rock musical groups
Psychedelic rock music groups from California
2009 establishments in California
Rock music supergroups